Parasi may refer to:
 Parasi District, a district in Nepal
 Parasi, India, a census town in Sonbhadra district of Uttar Pradesh of India
 Parasi, Nepal, a place in Nepal